Jenifer Rajkumar (born September 1, 1982) is an American politician and lawyer. A Democrat, she is a member of the New York State Assembly from the 38th district, representing Queens neighborhoods of Glendale, Ozone Park, Richmond Hill, Ridgewood, and Woodhaven. She is the first Indian American woman ever elected to a New York State Office.

Early life and education
Rajkumar was born and raised in New York. She is the daughter of immigrants from India who first settled in Queens. As a teenager, she attended Hackley School. Rajkumar earned a Bachelor of Arts degree from the University of Pennsylvania and a Juris Doctor from Stanford Law School. At Penn, she received the Alice Paul Award for exceptional community service to women and families.

Career
Rajkumar practiced civil rights law at Sanford Heisler LLP. She later worked as a fellow at the National Women's Law Center in Washington DC. She also served as an adjunct professor of political science at CUNY's Lehman College in the Bronx.

Political career

2011 District Leader race 
In 2011, Rajkumar became the first Indian American elected as the District Leader of the 65th District of the New York State Assembly, defeating a 28-year incumbent with over 70% of the vote. She was re-elected to that office two more times, in 2013 and 2015. As district leader, Rajkumar led the effort to bring M9 bus service back to Battery Park City in Lower Manhattan and has worked closely with Democracy for Battery Park City, an organization which seeks representation for residents of the neighborhood on the board of the Battery Park City Authority.

2013 City Council race
In 2013, Rajkumar ran for the New York City Council in the Democratic primary in New York City's first Council district, losing to incumbent Margaret Chin. Rajkumar won 41.5% of the vote. Rajkumar’s campaign championed affordable housing and community-friendly development. She was endorsed by various organizations and unions, such as The Sierra Club, and local Allied Craftworkers and Ironworkers groups.

2016 State Assembly race
She ran for the New York State Assembly in the 65th District, as the seat was occupied by Alice Cancel, the winner of a special election on April 19, 2016, to replace Sheldon Silver, who was convicted of corruption and expelled from the Assembly in 2015.

Rajkumar finished second in a six-way Democratic primary; the winner, Yuh-Line Niou, went on to win in the general election in November.

New York State government
On February 6, 2017, Governor Andrew Cuomo appointed Rajkumar as the Director of Immigration Affairs and Special Counsel for the New York Department of State. Rajkumar also served as a state-wide surrogate for Governor Cuomo.

2020 State Assembly race
Rajkumar ran in the primary for the 38th New York State Assembly district in Queens, which includes portions of the Glendale, Ozone Park, Richmond Hill, Ridgewood, and Woodhaven neighborhoods, against incumbent Democrat Michael G. Miller and challenger Joey De Jesus. Rajkumar was endorsed by California Congressman Ro Khanna in February 2020. In May 2020, City & State criticized Rajkumar alongside a slate of other candidates for carpetbagging across multiple primaries and elections.

Rajkumar defeated Miller and De Jesus in the June 2020 Democratic primary, and won over Giovanni Perna in the November general election. Along with Zohran Mamdani, Rajkumar was one of the first members of Indian ancestry elected to the Assembly, and the first American woman of Indian ancestry.

New York State Assembly tenure
Rajkumar was appointed by the Speaker of the Assembly as the Chair of the Subcommittee on Diversity in Law. She also serves on the following Assembly Committees: Judiciary, Veterans' Affairs, Committee on Aging, Consumer Affairs, and Small Business.

In her first term, Rajkumar passed a legislative package for domestic workers, securing them the full protections of the state human rights law, and expanding their paid family leave benefits. Governor Hochul signed Rajkumar's legislative package into law in December 2021. Rajkumar also passed a bill expanding benefits for victims of crime, which the Governor signed into law in June 2022.

She has come under intense scrutiny for her position on Forest Park. She has come out in favor of concrete parking lots.

In December 2021, Mayor-Elect Eric Adams appointed Rajkumar as a Senior Advisor on his Transition Team.

Personal life
Rajkumar is a Hindu and has advocated for making Diwali a school holiday.

See also

 Indian Americans in New York City

References

External links
 

1982 births
Living people
21st-century American politicians
Politicians from Queens, New York
University of Pennsylvania alumni
Stanford Law School alumni
American politicians of Indian descent
Democratic Party members of the New York State Assembly
Women state legislators in New York (state)
21st-century American women politicians
Asian-American people in New York (state) politics
American Hindus
People from Battery Park City